Pipar City railway station is a railway station in Jodhpur district, Rajasthan. Its code is PCY. It serves Piparcity. The station consists of a single platform. Passenger trains halt here.

References

Railway stations in Jodhpur district
Jodhpur railway division